List of commentaries on Maimonides' Mishneh Torah:

Before 1800s

mirkeves hamishnah, Shlomo of Chelm

1800s — present

 
Mishneh Torah, commentaries